Metius luridus is a species of ground beetle in the subfamily Pterostichinae. It was described by Chaudoir in 1837.

References

Metius (genus)
Beetles described in 1837